Catiuscia is a feminine given name in the Italian language.

List of people with the given name 

 Catiuscia Grillo (born 1996),  Italian professional racing cyclist
 Catiuscia Marini (born 1967), Italian politician who served as President of Umbria from 2010 to 2019
 Catiuscia Ricciarelli (born 1946), birth name of Katia Ricciarelli, the Italian opera singer

Italian feminine given names